WYKQ-LP (107.9 FM, Restauracion) is a radio station broadcasting a Contemporary Christian format. Licensed to Aguadilla-Aguada, Puerto Rico, the station serves the western Puerto Rico area. The station is currently owned by Jose Andrés Mercado Montalvo, through Restauracion Ministries, Inc.

On January 4, 2019, Taller Cultural Jaycoa sells WVDJ-LP for no consideration to Restauracion Ministries, Inc, a non-profit corporation managed by Jose Mercado Montalvo and it is expected to switch to a Contemporary Christian format. All of the WVDJ programming has been moved to an online radio station. On January 9, the station changed the call letters to WYKQ-LP. The sale of the station was dismissed on January 19, 2019. Instead, WYKQ-LP had still operated by Restauracion Ministries.

On March 3, 2020, for the second time in a row, Taller Cultural Jaycoa will sell WYKQ-LP to Restauracion Ministries, Inc; while maintaining the Contemporary Christian format. The sale was completed on April 14, 2020.

External links

Radio stations established in 2016
2016 establishments in Puerto Rico
YKQ-LP
Aguada, Puerto Rico
YKQ-LP